Lewis Wolfe Levy (13 June 1815 – 25 January 1885) was an English-born Australian businessman and politician.

Life and career

He was born in London, the son of merchant Benjamin Wolfe Levy and his wife Martha née Levy. He migrated to Sydney in 1840 and established himself at Maitland, before moving to Tamworth. There he took over an established store and went on to make it into one of the most significant businesses in Tamworth. In 1849 he formed a business partnership with his cousin Abraham Cohen. He was also a gold buyer during the gold rush period in the 1850s.

He moved back to Maitland in 1854 and where, in partnership with his cousins David and Samuel Cohen, he helped to run David Cohen & Co and was central in expanding that business.

His business skills were called on to help manage a number other enterprises. He was a director of the Hunter River Steam Navigation Company, the Australian Gas Light Company, the United Insurance Company, the Newcastle Wallsend Coal Co. and the Commercial Banking Company of Sydney.

Yarrowman, a pastoral run on the Liverpool Plains was his by 1871, and he was a partner in seven other runs.

He was also active in the civic sphere. He was a Justice of the Peace at Maitland by October 1858. He was living in Sydney by 1862 where he was a director of the Royal Prince Alfred Hospital and on the board of the Indigent Blind Institution.

He served as the president of the Macquarie Street Synagogue in Sydney from 1862 to 1874 and again from 1876 to 1877 when it closed. He also served on the board of the Sydney Hebrew School. In 1879 he laid the foundation stone of the Maitland Synagogue.

In 1845 he married Julia Solomon, who had come to New South Wales in 1835. The couple would have fifteen children.

Frequent and damaging floods in the Maitland area and the need for flood mitigation prompted him to stand for the New South Wales Parliament in 1871. He was elected to the Legislative Assembly for Liverpool Plains, but he did not re-contest in 1872. He was elected for West Maitland in 1874, but again retired at the general election later that year. In 1880 he was appointed to the Legislative Council as a representative of the Jewish community and he continued in that role till his death.

He died on 25 January 1885, survived by his wife and thirteen of their children. His estate was valued for probate at over £245,000. Most of his estate was left to family and friends with £3875 bequested to various charitable institutions.

An elaborate drinking fountain was built in the Sydney Botanic Gardens in his memory by his family in 1889. It is made of polished red and white granite and features a bronze figure by sculptor Charles Bell Birch. It was unveiled by the Premier of New South Wales, Sir Henry Parkes, during a ceremony on 17 December 1889.

References

Sources
 
 Levy family, the (1886) Memoir; Lewis Wolfe Levy, Sydney, John Sands, 29p.
 
 

1815 births
1885 deaths
Members of the New South Wales Legislative Assembly
Members of the New South Wales Legislative Council
19th-century Australian politicians
19th-century Australian businesspeople
Jewish Australian politicians
Australian people of British-Jewish descent